The Iroha is a Japanese poem.

Iroha may also refer to:
Iroha (band), an experimental rock band from Birmingham, England
Iroha, a character in Samurai Shodown
Iroha Igarashi, a female character in Real Girl (manga)
Iroha Isshiki, a female character in My Teen Romantic Comedy SNAFU
Iroha (イロハ), a brand of female masturbation aids by the Japanese company Tenga
Iroha (いろは), a character from Pop'n Music.
 Iroha (album)
Iroha Tamaki, a fictional character and main protagonist of the mobile game Magia Record
Irop'a, Korean textbook of Japanese published in 1492
Nekomura Iroha, a Vocaloid synthesizer software
Kazama Iroha, a Virtual YouTuber under Hololive Production
Iroha, A train service in Nikko Line

People with the surname
Benedict Iroha (born 1969), Nigerian former association football defender
Takumi Iroha (born 1993), Japanese female professional wrestler

See also
Hanasaku Iroha, a 2010 anime and 2011 manga